Louis Phillips may refer to:

Lou Diamond Phillips (born 1962), actor
Lou Phillips (1878–1916), rugby player
Louis Phillips (rancher) (1829–1900)
Louis Phillips (author) (born 1942)
Louis Phillips (cricketer) (born 1883), Jamaican cricketer

See also
Louis Philippe (disambiguation)